Events from the year 1942 in Ireland.

Incumbents
 President: Douglas Hyde
 Taoiseach: Éamon de Valera (FF)

Events
January – Newrath Bridge in County Wicklow collapses.
3 March – due to The Emergency the rationing of gas is introduced.
5 March – it is announced that Ireland is to have a new Central Bank replacing the old Currency Commission.
16 March – Irish Willow is detained by German submarine U-753 but released.
April – attempted shooting of two Garda Síochána detectives during a ceremony at Glasnevin Cemetery in Dublin, for which Brendan Behan is imprisoned.
2 June – speed levels are restricted to prevent wear of tyres on cars, motorcycles and buses.
Summer – Ailtirí na hAiséirghe, a radical nationalist and fascist political party, is founded by Gearóid Ó Cuinneagáin.
7 June – first mass held at the new Roman Catholic Cavan Cathedral (dedication 27 September).
11 August – Irish Rose rescues seven survivors from the American ship Wawaloam in the Atlantic.
13 August – Irish Pine rescues nineteen survivors from the British ship Richmond Castle in the Atlantic.
26 August – Irish Willow rescues 47 survivors from the British ship Empire Breeze in the Atlantic.
17 September – Irish Larch rescues forty survivors from the Panamanian ship Stone Street in the Atlantic.
2 October – British cruiser  collides with the liner Queen Mary off the coast of Donegal and sinks: 338 die.
15 November – Irish Pine torpedoed and sunk by U-608, in North Atlantic: 33 die.
12 December – Irish Poplar collides with the launch Eileen and the Cork Harbour pilot during a force eight gale: five die.
22 December – there are reports of a split in the Labour Party due to the selection of candidates for the forthcoming general election.
December – Government prohibits direct newspaper advertising in Ireland of jobs in the U.K. During the year £4.5M is remitted to Ireland from Irish workers already in Britain through the Post Office.
Lice-born typhus spreads.

Arts and literature
16 March – Paul Vincent Carroll's wartime drama The Strings Are False premieres at the Olympia Theatre (Dublin).
June – Brendan Behan's "I Become a Borstal Boy" is published in The Bell.
Elizabeth Bowen publishes Bowen's Court.
Ina Boyle's sketch for small orchestra Wildgeese is premiered.
Eric Cross publishes his novel The Tailor and Ansty, which is prohibited in Ireland by the Censorship of Publications Board.
Patrick Kavanagh's poetry The Great Hunger is published by the Cuala Press.
Maura Laverty's novel Never No More is published, having been serialised in The Bell.
Seán Ó Súilleabháin's A Handbook of Irish Folklore is published for the Folklore of Ireland Society in Dublin.

Sport

Football

League of Ireland
Winners: Cork United
FAI Cup
Winners: Dundalk 2 – 2, 3 – 1 Cork United.

Golf
Irish Open is not played due to The Emergency.

Births
12 January
John Moore, Roman Catholic Bishop of the Diocese of Bauchi, Nigeria.
Hilary Weston, 26th Lieutenant Governor of Ontario (from 1997 to 2002).
16 January – Tony Doyle, actor (died 2000).
18 January – Eric Barber, soccer player.
1 February – P. J. Mara, political adviser and senator (died 2016).
12 February – Robert Ellison, Roman Catholic Bishop of the Diocese of Banjul, Gambia.
22 April – Aengus Fanning, journalist and editor (d. 2012).
15 May – Pádraic McCormack, Fine Gael TD for Galway West.
May – Enda Colleran, Gaelic footballer (died 2004).
28 July – John Bowman, historian and broadcaster.
1 August – Ned O'Keeffe, Independent TD for Cork East, originally Fianna Fáil.
18 August – Tommy Carroll, soccer player.
25 August – Pat Ingoldsby, television presenter, poet.
30 August – Jonathan Aitken, Conservative Member of Parliament (UK), perjurer and Anglican priest.
17 September – Des Lynam, sportscaster and British television personality.
4 October – Frank Stagg, Provisional Irish Republican Army member (died of hunger strike 1976 in Wakefield Prison).
20 October – Philomena Begley, country music singer.
24 October – Frank Delaney, novelist, journalist and broadcaster (died 2017).
28 November – Eiléan Ní Chuilleanáin, poet.
24 December – Anthony Clare, psychiatrist and broadcaster (died 2007).
Full date unknown
Jackie Gilroy, Gaelic footballer (died 2007).
Padraig O'Malley, peacemaker, professor at the University of Massachusetts Boston and writer.
Dermot O'Reilly, musician, producer and songwriter in Canada (died 2007).
Ted Tynan, Workers' Party councillor in Cork.
Macdara Woods, poet (died 2018).

Deaths
1 January – John Meredith, Australian Army Brigadier General (born 1864).
8 January – Thomas Hughes, soldier, recipient of the Victoria Cross for gallantry in 1916 at Guillemont, France (born 1885).
14 January – James Graham, cricketer (born 1906).
7 February – Bishop Patrick McKenna, Bishop of Clogher, 1909–1942 (born 1868).
8 April – Philip Meldon, cricketer (died 1874).
20 April – Thomas Kelly, founding member of Sinn Féin, member of 1st Dáil (Pro Treaty), later a member of Fianna Fáil.
11 May – George Nicolls, Sinn Féin and Cumann na nGaedheal TD.
29 May – Samuel Jacob Jackson, politician in Canada (born 1848).
30 June – Robert Pilkington, lawyer and politician who sat in Western Australian Legislative Assembly and British House of Commons (born 1870).
1 July – Peadar Toner Mac Fhionnlaoich, Irish Language writer (born 1857)
15 July – Paddy Finucane, RAF fighter pilot, youngest Wing Commander in RAF history, killed in action (born 1920).
10 September – Patrick Stone, Member of the Western Australian Legislative Assembly (born 1857).
12 September – Patrick R. Chalmers, writer on field sports and poet (born 1872).
30 September – Jack Finlay, Laois hurler and TD (born 1889).
6 November – Éamon a Búrc, tailor and seanchaí (born 1866).
23 November – Peadar Kearney, Irish Republican and songwriter, writer of the lyrics to The Soldier's Song (born 1883).

References

-

 
1940s in Ireland
Ireland
Independent Ireland in World War II
Years of the 20th century in Ireland